Shoal Harbour is a small community in Newfoundland and Labrador, Canada, linked to and under the same Municipality of Clarenville.

See also
 List of communities in Newfoundland and Labrador

Former towns in Newfoundland and Labrador
Populated coastal places in Canada
Populated places in Newfoundland and Labrador